is a Japanese manga series written and illustrated by Kaoru Shintani about a fictional United States corporation, led by the beautiful and spirited Cleopatra Corns.

Plot
Cleopatra, or Cleo as she is known to her friends, would much rather go on vacation in some exotic locale than concern herself with the business end of the Corns Conglomerate, which is the most powerful economic player in the United States. However, Cleo has a kind and forgiving nature, and will not shy away if trouble is near.  And more often than she cares for, Cleo and her friends find themselves in all sorts of fantastic adventures, from putting out oil well fires to safeguarding a powerful telepathic girl.

Characters
 Cleopatra Corns
 Swen
 Nacky
 Shorty
 Marianne
 Colonel Karts
 Strange Woman
 Sarah

Episodes
 "Lighting Bolt of Apollo"
 "Crystal Pharaoh"
 "Pandora's Box"

References

External links 
 

1986 manga
1989 anime OVAs
Adventure anime and manga
J.C.Staff
Kaoru Shintani